Abdourahmane Barry (born 21 February 2000) is a French professional footballer who plays as a centre-back for  club Amiens.

Club career 
Barry made his 2. Liga debut on 27 July 2018 against SV Horn. He played the full game.

On 10 July 2020, Barry's contract with FC Red Bull Salzburg was terminated.

In August 2020, Barry joined 2. Bundesliga club SpVgg Greuther Fürth signing a two-year contract with the option of a third year.

In June 2022, Barry returned to France and signed with Amiens.

Personal life 
Born in France, Barry is of Guinean descent.

References

External links

Living people
2000 births
People from Courbevoie
Footballers from Hauts-de-Seine
Association football defenders
French footballers
French sportspeople of Guinean descent
2. Liga (Austria) players
2. Bundesliga players
Bundesliga players
FC Liefering players
SpVgg Greuther Fürth players
Amiens SC players
French expatriate footballers
French expatriate sportspeople in Austria
French expatriate sportspeople in Germany
Expatriate footballers in Austria
Expatriate footballers in Germany
Black French sportspeople